The ruble was the independent currency of the First Republic of Armenia and the Armenian Soviet Socialist Republic between 1919 and 1923. It replaced the first Transcaucasian ruble at par and was replaced by the second Transcaucasian ruble after Armenia became part of the Transcaucasian Soviet Federal Socialist Republic. No subdivisions of the ruble were issued and the currency existed only as banknotes.

Banknotes
Provisional cheques were issued by the First Republic of Armenia in denominations of 5, 10, 25, 50, 100, 250, 500, 1,000, 5,000, and 10,000 rubles. Most were quite crudely printed with mostly Russian text. However, three actual banknotes in denominations of 50, 100 and 250 rubles were printed in the UK by Waterlow and Sons Ltd. The notes were designed by artists Arshak Fetvadjian and Hakob Kojoyan. These notes are adorned with Armenian, French, and Russian text.

The ASSR issued denominations between 5,000, 10,000, 25,000, 100,000, 500,000, 1,000,000, and 5,000,000 rubles. These notes bore Armenian and Russian texts together with communist slogans in various languages on the reverses.

See also

Armenian dram

References

Modern obsolete currencies
Economy of Armenia
1919 establishments in Armenia
1923 disestablishments in Armenia
Currencies of Armenia